McRae is an unincorporated community in northern Alberta within the County of St. Paul No. 19, located  south of Highway 55,  west of Cold Lake.

Localities in the County of St. Paul No. 19